This is a list of rivers in Paraguay.

By drainage basin
This list is arranged by drainage basin, with respective tributaries indented under each larger stream's name.

La Plata Basin

 Paraná River
 Paraguay River
 Tebicuary River
 Pilcomayo River
 Salado River

 Piribebuy River
 Confuso River
 Manduvirá River
 Jejuy River
 Yhagüy River
 Aguaray-Guazú River
 Negro River
 Aguaray-Guazú River
 Jejuí Guazú River
 Curuguaty River
 Monte Lindo River
 Ypané River
 Aquidabán River
 Verde River
 Apa River
 Melo River
 Tímane River
 Bamburral River or Negro
 Monday River
 Acaray River
 Yguazú River
 Ytambey River
 Carapá River

See also
Rivers of Paraguay
 List of rivers of the Americas by coastline

References
Rand McNally, The New International Atlas, 1993.
, GEOnet Names Server

Paraguay
 
Rivers